N42 may refer to:

 BMW N42, an automobile engine
 , a submarine of the Royal Navy
 Kunda language, a Bantu language of Zimbabwe
 Limilngan language, an extinct Aboriginal Australian language
 , a minelayer of the Lithuanian Navy
 Tien Shan Astronomical Observatory, in Kazakhstan